I Want to Work for Diddy 2 is a reality show on VH1. It is the second season of I Want to Work for Diddy, where contestants are brought together to see who can become Sean Combs' personal assistant. Mark Jacobs is the show's co-executive producer and director. I Want to Work for Diddy 2 premiered on November 2, 2009. In the end, Ebony Jones was chosen to be his assistant.

Contestants

Judges
 Capricorn Clark – Marketing Director, Sean John
 Phil Robinson – Diddy's former manager
 Andre Harrell – Diddy's mentor
 Kim "Poprah" Kearney – Former contestant (guest judge)

Weekly Results

Teams
 The contestant was on the Uptown team.
 The contestant was on the Downtown team.

Competition
 The contestant won.
 The contestant was eliminated, but still hired.
 The contestant won the challenge and was safe.
 The contestant won the challenge and was in the bottom.
 The contestant was in the bottom two or three, but was not eliminated.
 The contestant was eliminated.
 The contestant was out of the competition, after she was told to reveal that she was a spy for Diddy.
 The contestant was not included in the episode, or was a judge.
 The contestant lost the challenge but was safe.

Notes
Kim "Poprah" Kearney from season one returned and joined the competition.
In Episode 2, Melissa was voted to move from the Downtown Team to the Uptown Team so that both teams had an equal number of contestants.
Capricorn Clark said that Kim "Poprah" would switch teams every week.
Kennis was not originally put up for elimination, but was eliminated.
In Episode 4, Poprah revealed herself as a spy for Diddy, when she was a judge for elimination. Therefore Diddy no longer needed her and was out of the competition.
In Episode 5, Poprah was the judge for elimination, and Poprah said that there would be no more teams.
In Episode 7, Dalen and Ebony were not originally put up for elimination.
In Episode 7, everyone was at risk of being eliminated, but all were ultimately given one more chance to prove themselves.
In Episodes 1,3,5 & 7 Ivory used her infamous catch phrase "manwhich a bitch" a phrase that caught on with fans instantly.

Episodes

Welcome to Bad Boy
First aired November 2, 2009

Challenge: Collect the Most Foreign Languages
Challenge Winners: Downtown Team
Bottom 2: Ivory, Noelle
Eliminated: Noelle
Ivory became a fan favorite and quickly earned the title of having the catchphrase of the season after telling one of her competitors she was going to "manwhich a bitch" 
Elimination Notes: After Noelle's elimination, Melissa was switched to the Uptown Team.

Sean John Reinvented
First aired November 9, 2009

Challenge: Shoot a Print Ad for the New Sean John Logo
Challenge Winners: Downtown Team
Bottom 2: Ivory, Zach
Eliminated: Zach
Elimination Notes: Poprah returned to the competition after making a special guest appearance.

Chariots for Charity
First aired November 16, 2009

Challenge: Collect Donations for the Fresh Air Fund
Downtown: $1700
Uptown: $5500
Challenge Winners: Uptown Team
Bottom 3: Blake, Ebony, John
Eliminated: Blake, John
Elimination Notes: Poprah was moved to the Downtown Team to even the teams after the Uptown Team lost two members in elimination.

Diddy or Didn't He?
First aired November 23, 2009

1st Challenge: Assist Mr. Combs in Doing Press Interviews
2nd Challenge: Play Diddy or Didn't He? Game Show
Downtown: 110 pts.
Uptown: 50 pts.
Challenge Winners: Downtown
Bottom 2: Ivory, Kennis
Eliminated: Kennis
Left: Poprah
Episode/Elimination Notes: Kennis was not originally put up for elimination, but was eliminated; Poprah leaves the house after she reveals herself that she was a spy for Diddy.

Welcome to Daddy's House
First aired November 30, 2009

Challenge: Work The Night Shift At Diddy's House
Challenge Winners: Ebony
Bottom 2: Jen, Melissa
Eliminated: Melissa
Elimination Notes: Both teams are at elimination; Poprah talks with them instead of Capricorn about who they should vote for.

Truth and Its Consequences
First aired December 7, 2009

Challenge: Learning To Be Honest
Challenge Winner: None
Bottom 5: Dalen, Daniel, Ebony, Ivory, Jen
Eliminated: Jen
Elimination/Episode Notes: Elimination is held at Diddy's office, and Diddy decides who goes home; there are no more teams starting from Episode 6; Diddy felt that he would not hire someone like Jen and eliminated her.

A Family Affair
First aired December 14, 2009

Challenge: Family Dinner At Sea
Challenge Winner: Daniel 
Bottom 4: Dalen, Daniel, Ebony, Ivory 
Eliminated: None
Elimination/Episode Notes: Dalen and Ebony were not originally put up for elimination.

The Fashion Event
First aired December 21, 2009

Challenge: Throw A Preview Party For New Sean John Collection
Challenge Winner: None
Bottom 2: Dalen, Daniel 
Eliminated: Dalen
Elimination/Episode Notes: With only four contestants remaining, team competitions were eliminated and it became a 1-versus-all format.

The Fashion Event Pt. 2
First aired December 28, 2009

Challenge: Throw A Preview Party For New Sean John Collection
Challenge Winner: None
Bottom: Daniel, Ebony and Ivory
Eliminated: Ivory
Elimination/Episode Notes: Capricorn saves the fashion show from disaster.  The exercise ball incident from the first episode is brought up again and Ivory is eliminated.

Season Finale
First aired January 4, 2010

Challenge: Assist Mr. Combs
Runner-Up: Daniel
Winner: Ebony

External links 
 Official Site

VH1 original programming
2009 American television seasons